Walkover is a 1965 Polish drama film directed by Jerzy Skolimowski. It is the second feature film directed by Skolimowski, and again features his alter ego, Andrzej Leszczyc, whose story is continued from the film Rysopis.

Cast 
 Aleksandra Zawieruszanka as Teresa Karczewska
 Jerzy Skolimowski as Andrzej Leszczyc
 Krzysztof Chamiec as a chief of the factory
 Elżbieta Czyżewska as a girl on the station
 Andrzej Herder as Marian Pawlak
 Stanisław Marian Kamiński
 Andrzej Jurczak
 Franciszek Pieczka

References 

1965 films
1960s sports drama films
Films directed by Jerzy Skolimowski
Films with screenplays by Jerzy Skolimowski
1960s Polish-language films
Polish boxing films
Polish sports drama films
1965 drama films